No Man Knows My Pastries: The Secret (Not Sacred) Recipes of Sister Enid Christensen, published in 1992 by Signature Books, is a cookbook by Americans Roger B. Salazar and Michael G. Wightman. Salazar writes as his alterego, Sister Enid Christensen, and Wightman as Brother Christensen.

The book title is a reference to the 1945 biography No Man Knows My History, by Fawn Brodie.

References

1992 non-fiction books
American cookbooks
Signature Books books